Kelly Amonte Hiller is the head women's lacrosse coach at Northwestern University. She has coached Northwestern to seven NCAA Women's Lacrosse Championships.  Amonte Hiller played for the University of Maryland Terrapins, and won two national championships as a player.  She was named the ACC Female Athlete of the Year in 1996. In 2012, Amonte Hiller was inducted into the National Lacrosse Hall of Fame.

Amonte Hiller is the sister of former National Hockey League player Tony Amonte.  She attended high school at Thayer Academy.

References

External links
 Kelly Amonte Hiller - Official biography on Northwestern University Sports

People from Hingham, Massachusetts
Maryland Terrapins women's lacrosse players
Living people
Northwestern Wildcats women's lacrosse coaches
Year of birth missing (living people)
Sportspeople from Plymouth County, Massachusetts